The Timeline of the Spanish Civil War allows observation of the proceedings of the Spanish Civil War between 1936 and 1939.

History of the Spanish Civil War, by year 

 1936 in the Spanish Civil War
 1937 in the Spanish Civil War
 1938–39 in the Spanish Civil War

See also 

 List of foreign ships wrecked or lost in the Spanish Civil War
 List of Spanish Civil War films
 List of Spanish Civil War flying aces
 List of Spanish Cross in Gold with Swords and Diamonds recipients
 List of tanks in the Spanish Civil War
 List of war films and TV specials: Spanish Civil War
 Martyrs of the Spanish Civil War
 Spain during World War II
 Spanish Republican Armed Forces

Chronology of the Spanish Civil War